Dexter: New Blood is an American crime drama mystery miniseries developed for Showtime as a continuation of the series Dexter, developed by original series showrunner, Clyde Phillips, and directed by Marcos Siega. The show features Michael C. Hall and Jennifer Carpenter reprising their roles as Dexter and Debra Morgan, respectively, alongside new cast members Jack Alcott, Julia Jones, Johnny Sequoyah, Alano Miller, and Clancy Brown. The story is set ten years after the events of the original series finale, "Remember the Monsters?", which was broadcast in 2013. It premiered on Showtime on November 7, 2021.

Originally considered to be a standalone miniseries, it was confirmed in February 2023 that a second season, centered around the character of Dexter's son Harrison, is in development for broadcast at a later date.

Premise 
After faking his death ten years ago in a hurricane, Dexter Morgan has moved to the fictional small town of Iron Lake, New York, hiding his identity under the name of Jim Lindsay, a clerk at a local wilderness sporting gear store. He has a romantic relationship with the town's chief of police Angela Bishop, and has been successfully suppressing his vigilante serial killing urges. Dexter's deceased sister, Debra, is an imaginary presence he often speaks to. In the first episode, his estranged son Harrison from his previous life arrives unannounced with mysterious motives. A string of incidents around Iron Lake causes Dexter to fear that the "Dark Passenger" within him, and potentially within his son, will reveal itself.

Cast

Main 
 Michael C. Hall as Dexter Morgan / Jim Lindsay
 Jack Alcott as Harrison Morgan
 Julia Jones as Police Chief Angela Bishop
 Johnny Sequoyah as Audrey Bishop
 Alano Miller as Sergeant Logan
 Jennifer Carpenter as Debra Morgan
 Clancy Brown as Kurt Caldwell

Special guest stars
 David Zayas as Angel Batista
 John Lithgow as Arthur Mitchell / Trinity Killer

Recurring

 David Magidoff as Teddy Reed
 Katy Sullivan as Esther
 Michael Cyril Creighton as Fred Jr.
 Gizel Jiménez as Tess
 Gregory Cruz as Abraham Brown	   
 Jamie Chung as Molly Park
 Shuler Hensley as Elric
In addition, Oscar Wahlberg co-stars as Zach, Iron Lake High School's wrestling team captain.

Episodes

Production

Development
The series finale of Dexter, in which Dexter flees Miami and ends up as a lumberjack in Oregon, was polarizing to the show's fans, according to lead actor Michael C. Hall. He said "I think the ending was 'mystifying' at best to people. 'Confounding', 'exasperating', 'frustrating' — on down the line of negative adjectives." Hall had been asked by fans in the eight years since the finale aired if there would be a follow-up to the show. Original showrunner Clyde Phillips, who had left the series after season 4, saw those questions asked of Hall and over time discussed possible ways to continue Dexter as some type of redemption, but could not figure out an appropriate route. Phillips was contacted by Showtime president Gary Levine on July 1, 2019. Levine told Phillips that he felt the time was right to bring back Dexter and asked if Phillips could come up with something. Phillips wrote a preliminary script which he then shared with Hall, who loved the idea.

Phillips recognized the ending had suited the time when it was broadcast, as around 2013, there were a number of real-life serial killers known to be living in Oregon and nearby states. Phillips also considered that by surrounding himself with chainsaws, Dexter was under a constant reminder about how his mother had died. As Phillips was unsure of the intent that the finale was meant to deliver, he decided to incorporate a major timeskip, nearly a decade from the end of events of the original series. Dexter has since moved to the fictional town of Iron Lake, New York and is living under a pseudonym, working in an outfitter shop selling guns for hunting and has ingratiated himself comfortably into the local community. Because of that, Phillips did not consider the miniseries as a ninth season, since there was a major discontinuity in the serialization of the story. As the writing staff wrote out the ten-episode miniseries, they established how the series would end and wrote backwards from that. Phillips claimed that "The ending of this one will be stunning, shocking, surprising, unexpected. And without jinxing anything, I will say that the ending of this new season that we're doing will blow up the internet."

On October 14, 2020, the Dexter revival was ordered as a limited series consisting of 10 episodes, starring Hall in his original role, with Phillips returning as showrunner. On November 17, 2020, it was announced Marcos Siega would direct six of the ten episodes of the limited series as well as serving as an executive producer alongside Hall, John Goldwyn, Sara Colleton, Bill Carraro, and Scott Reynolds. It premiered on November 7, 2021, on Showtime. While a second season had been considered, Showtime ceased moving forward on it by the end of January 2023, instead pivoting to a prequel series about a younger Dexter.

Casting
In January 2021, Clancy Brown, Julia Jones, Alano Miller, Johnny Sequoyah, Jack Alcott, and David Magidoff joined the main cast. On February 11, 2021, Jamie Chung and Oscar Wahlberg were cast in recurring roles. On June 28, 2021, John Lithgow joined the cast to reprise his role as Arthur Mitchell, the Trinity Killer, in a cameo appearance. On July 13, 2021, it was announced that original series regular Jennifer Carpenter would reprise her role as Dexter's sister Debra in some capacity for the limited series. On August 24, 2021, it was reported that Carpenter is confirmed to reprise her role as a series regular, appearing as Dexter's  "imaginary iteration of Debra".

Filming
Production began in February 2021, with most of the show filmed in Shelburne Falls, Massachusetts, serving as a stand-in for Iron Lake. Exterior filming had to be coordinated around the weather, as the creators wanted to have a significant amount of snow in those shots, including a local frozen lake. Interior filming at New England Studios started around July 2021 over a fifty-day period. The series developer Clyde Phillips said there were 119 days of filming.

Additional filming locations were on Rt 117 in Lancaster,  Bolton (Nashoba Regional High), and Shirley (Bull Run Restaurant), Massachusetts.

Reception

Critical response 
Review aggregator Rotten Tomatoes reported an approval rating of 77% based on 56 reviews, with an average rating of 7.20/10. The website's critics consensus reads, "Anchored by Michael C. Hall's still-compelling portrayal of the title character, Dexter: New Blood helps restore some of the luster lost by the show's contentious finale." Metacritic gave the series a weighted average score of 61 out of 100 based on 29 critic reviews, indicating "generally favorable reviews". The finale in particular was not received well by fans and became the lowest rated episode in the entire series. IMDb fans gave it a 4.6/10 placing it below the divisive season eight finale's 4.7/10.

Hall also won TVLine's Performer of the Week ending January 15, 2022, for the finale episode.

Ratings

Awards and nominations

Future
In February 2023, it was announced that Dexter: New Blood will continue with a story centered around Dexter's son, Harrison Morgan. In the new season, a continuation of the series, the character struggles with his own violent nature and whether he will follow in his father's footsteps.

A prequel series titled Dexter: Origins is also in development with a straight-to-series order. Depicting the earlier years of the Dexter's life, the show will follow his years after college graduation, and his first introduction to various characters from the original series. Members of his family will feature as main characters.

Additional spin-off series, depicting the origins of various other characters from the original show including the Trinity Killer are also in development. The new franchise is being overlooked by Clyde Phillips, creator of Dexter. The multiple television shows will be developed through Showtime's merger with Paramount+.

Notes

References

External links 
 
 

2020s American crime drama television series
2020s American horror television series
2020s American mystery television series
2021 American television series debuts
2022 American television series endings
Dexter (TV series)
English-language television shows
Showtime (TV network) original programming
Television series about fictional serial killers
Television shows based on American novels
Television shows set in New York (state)
Television shows filmed in Massachusetts